Gibraltar Cathedral may refer to:

 Cathedral of the Holy Trinity, Gibraltar (Anglican)
 Cathedral of St. Mary the Crowned (Roman Catholic)